Minà is a surname. Notable people with the surname include:

Francesco Minà Palumbo (1814–1899), Italian naturalist
Gianni Minà (born 1938), Italian journalist